is a Japanese actress. She works mainly in pink films, and has appeared in more than thirty films since 1999.

Selected filmography

Movies

References

External links
  
 Official agency profile 

1974 births
Living people
Actresses from Tokyo
Japanese film actresses
Japanese television actresses